Josef Václav Sládek (27 October 1845 in Zbiroh – 28 June 1912 in Zbiroh) was a Czech poet, journalist and translator, member of the literary group , pioneer of children's poetry in Czech lands.

In 1865, he graduated at the Academic Gymnasium in Prague. In 1867, he became suspected by the Austro-Hungarian police of supporting the Czech opposition movement against the monarchy. In 1868 he moved to United States, where he spent two years working as a laborer. He was interested in the fate of indigenous peoples and blacks. He described his American experience in a collection of poems (titled Poems) and in one prose (American images). His stay in the USA influenced him significantly. Throughout the rest of his life he focused on translating Anglo-American literature. He translated 33 plays by William Shakespeare and other works by Burns, Longfellow, Hart, Byron, Coleridge etc.
Less known fact is that Sládek translated the Czech anthem Kde domov můj into English.

References

External links

Josef Václav Sládek in The Great Soviet Encyclopedia (1979)

Czech male poets
Czech journalists
Czech translators
1845 births
1912 deaths
People from Rokycany District
19th-century translators